Scurry County is a county located in the U.S. state of Texas. As of the 2020 census, its population was 16,932. Its county seat is Snyder, which is the  home for Western Texas College. Scurry County is named for Confederate General William Scurry. The county was created in 1876 and organized in 1884. Scurry County was one of 46 prohibition, or entirely dry, counties in the state of Texas, until a 2006 election approved the sale of beer and wine in Snyder, and a 2008 election approved the sale of liquor by the drink throughout the county.

Scurry County comprises the Snyder, Texas, micropolitan statistical area.

History
This county, lying directly north of Mitchell County, was created in 1876, and was organized June 28, 1884. It was named for William Read Scurry, lawyer and Confederate Army general. Until 1909, it was without railroad facilities, and the nearest shipping points were Colorado City to the south and still later the railroad towns in Fisher County to the east.

The first railroad was the Roscoe, Snyder and Pacific Railway, built from Roscoe on the Texas & Pacific in Nolan County, to Snyder, the county seat of Scurry County, about 1909, and subsequently extended to Fluvanna, also in Scurry County. In 1911, the Texico-Coleman division of the Santa Fe system was built through the county, giving it a trunk line of railway. Development has been particularly rapid during the early 1900s.

Some of the important pioneer facts concerning Scurry County are found in a sketch of W.H. Snyder, after whom the county seat town was named. In 1877, he opened a trading camp in the county, hauling lumber on wagons from Dallas to build his store and also hauling a good portion of his goods from the same place. He used what was known as trail wagons, with seven yoke of oxen to a team, each wagon having a capacity of 50,000 pounds. Mr. Snyder erected a house in Scurry County and began dealing in general merchandise and supplies for buffalo hunters. Other parties moved into the same locality, and that was the beginning of the town of Snyder.

In 1882, Mr. Snyder laid out the town, and two years later, it became the county seat. Snyder has had an enterprising citizenship, and 10 years later had an independent school district and four churches, and was an important center for trade.

Its importance has greatly increased since the coming of the railway, and in 1910, its population was 2,154. Other towns have sprung up along the railway, the most important of which is Fluvanna, at the terminus of the Roscoe, Snyder & Pacific, and Hermleigh."

Geography

Since 1952, Lake J. B. Thomas has operated in Scurry County covering up to 7,282 acres when filled to the morning glory spillway at elevation of 2,258 ft above sea level.

Major highways
  U.S. Highway 84
  U.S. Highway 180
  State Highway 208
  State Highway 350

Adjacent counties
 Kent County (north)
 Fisher County (east)
 Mitchell County (south)
 Borden County (west)
 Garza County (northwest)

Demographics

Note: the US Census treats Hispanic/Latino as an ethnic category. This table excludes Latinos from the racial categories and assigns them to a separate category. Hispanics/Latinos can be of any race.

As of the census of 2000,  16,361 people, 5,756 households, and 4,161 families resided in the county.  The population density was 18 people per square mile (7/km2).  The 7,112 housing units averaged 8 per square mile (3/km2).  The racial makeup of the county was 81.27% White, 6.06% Black or African American, 0.53% Native American, 0.23% Asian, 10.51% from other races, and 1.41% from two or more races. About  27.77% of the population were Hispanic or Latino of any race.

Of the 5,756 households, 33.90% had children under the age of 18 living with them, 58.40% were married couples living together, 10.40% had a female householder with no husband present, and 27.70% were not families; 25.10% of all households were made up of individuals, and 12.90% had someone living alone who was 65 years of age or older.  The average household size was 2.55, and the average family size was 3.05.

In the county, the population was distributed as 25.20% under the age of 18, 10.70% from 18 to 24, 26.20% from 25 to 44, 22.40% from 45 to 64, and 15.40% who were 65 years of age or older.  The median age was 37 years. For every 100 females, there were 107.80 males.  For every 100 females age 18 and over, there were 109.50 males.

The median income for a household in the county was $31,646, and for a family was $38,467. Males had a median income of $30,399 versus $18,061 for females. The per capita income for the county was $15,871.  About 12.60% of families and 16.00% of the population were below the poverty line, including 21.60% of those under age 18 and 11.70% of those age 65 or over.

Communities

City
 Snyder (county seat)

Census-designated place
 Hermleigh

Unincorporated communities
 Dunn
 Fluvanna
 Ira

Politics

Gallery

See also

 Recorded Texas Historic Landmarks in Scurry County

References

External links
 Scurry County government's website
 
 Historic Scurry County materials, hosted by the Portal to Texas History.
 TXGenWeb Scurry County website
 Scurry County Genealogy Trails
 Scurry County Profile from the Texas Association of Counties

 
1884 establishments in Texas
Populated places established in 1884
Micropolitan areas of Texas